Don't Bother to Knock is a 1952 American psychological thriller starring Richard Widmark and Marilyn Monroe and directed by Roy Ward Baker.

The screenplay was written by Daniel Taradash, based on the 1951 novel Mischief by Charlotte Armstrong.

Monroe is featured as a disturbed babysitter watching a child at the same New York hotel where a pilot, played by Widmark, is staying. He starts flirting with her, but over the evening her strange behavior makes him increasingly aware that she is unhinged.  How he copes with the situation ends up profoundly impacting all three lives.

Plot
Lyn Lesley is the lounge singer at New York's McKinley Hotel.  She muses to the bartender about her relationship with an airline pilot, Jed Towers, revealing she had ended their six-month relationship with a letter. Jed has checked in at the same hotel and approaches her; she explains that she sees no future with him because his coldness with people shows he "lacks an understanding heart".  He strongly rejects her dismissal, but ultimately retreats to his room.

Meanwhile, elevator operator Eddie introduces his reticent niece, Nell Forbes, to guests Peter and Ruth Jones as a babysitter for their daughter Bunny. The Joneses leave for an awards convention banquet downstairs. After she puts the child to bed, Nell tries on Ruth's negligee, then her jewelry, perfume, and lipstick. Seeing the striking young Nell from his room directly across an air shaft, Jed calls her on the house phone; alternately curious and put-off, she rebuffs his aggressive advances. When Eddie checks up on her, he is appalled to find Nell wearing Ruth's things and orders her to take them off. He tells her she can have such indulgences for herself by finding a boyfriend to replace the one she is still struggling to get over, a pilot who was killed in an aircraft accident. After Eddie leaves, Nell puts them back on and invites Jed over.

He brings the bottle of whisky he has been drinking and pours both of them large glasses.  Nell tells him a series of lies, painting herself as a wealthy globe-trotter. She is startled when he reveals that he is a pilot. She confides that her boyfriend Philip died while flying a bomber to Hawaii during World War II. Aware something awry is going on, the precocious Bunny appears and shatters Nell's charade. Furious, Nell shakes the child and orders her back to bed. Jed hears her sobs and comforts her, letting her stay up with them. When Bunny hangs out an open window next to Nell, the troubled woman fights with an urge to push her out. Jed snatches Bunny away, but the incident is witnessed by long-term hotel resident (and notorious busybody) Emma Ballew.

Out of Jed's earshot, Nell threatens Bunny, putting her back to bed. Jarred by events and Nell's roller-coaster swings, Jed's thoughts return to Lyn. Nell begs him not to leave. As he is fending off a kiss from her, Jed sees the telltale scars of slashing on her wrists. Nell confesses that after Philip died she tried to kill herself with a razor.

When Eddie checks up on Nell after his shift is over, Nell shoos Jed into the bathroom and quickly tidies the room. Irate that Nell is still wearing Ruth's things, Eddie orders her to change clothes, then harshly rubs off her lipstick. This enrages Nell, who accuses Eddie of being just like her repressive parents. Then, when he suspects there is someone in the bathroom, she hits him over the head with a heavy ashtray. While Jed tends to Eddie, Nell slips into Bunny's room.

A prying Emma Ballew knocks on the door, accompanied by her reluctant husband. Fearing desperately for his job, Eddie urges Jed to hide while he slips into the closet. Jed sneaks into Bunny's room, not noticing, in the dark, that the child is now bound and gagged; he slips away down the hall, but the Ballews see him and assume he was an intruder in Nell's room.  Nell plays along as a victim, they alert the hotel detective, and a chase is on.  She is now so deluded that she believes Jed is Philip.  Locking Eddie in, she again goes into Bunny's room.

At the bar, Jed tells Lyn about Nell. She is pleasantly surprised by his concern. Suddenly realizing that he saw Bunny on the wrong bed, Jed rushes back up. Anxious to simply check on her daughter, Ruth Jones arrives first, and screams when she enters Bunny's room. The women grapple. Jed pulls Nell away and unties Bunny, but Nell slips away in the confusion when the detective arrives.

Eddie explains that Nell had spent the previous three years in an Oregon mental institution following her suicide attempt, but was supposed to have been cured. In the lobby, Nell steals a razor blade from a sales display. Surrounded by a mob, she holds it at her own throat. Lyn tries to calm her down. Jed appears, and, waving off police, demands Nell give him the weapon. She does, and he tries to get through her haze that he is not Philip and that the real Philip is dead. He assures her that she will get the help she needs by leaving with an officer. As she is led away, Lyn is taken by Jed's display of genuine empathy, and impulsively yields to a reconciliation.

Cast
 Richard Widmark as Jed Towers  
 Marilyn Monroe as Nell Forbes  
 Anne Bancroft as Lyn Lesley  
 Donna Corcoran as Bunny Jones  
 Jeanne Cagney as Rochelle  
 Lurene Tuttle as Ruth Jones  
 Elisha Cook Jr. as Eddie Forbes  
 Jim Backus as Peter Jones  
 Verna Felton as Emma Ballew  
 Willis Bouchey as Joe the Bartender (as Willis B. Bouchey)  
 Don Beddoe as Mr. Ballew

Reception

Critical response
The reviewer for the New York Post was generally pleased with the film's individual performances, but panned its plot and structure.  He described Monroe as “surprisingly good”, and Widmark “terse, decisive and efficient, in veteran pilot style.” Of the work's direction, plot, and portrayals he wrote: “The picture’s suspense sequences are fairly effective both in gradual build-up and climaxes, but the conclusion, implying that all this had taken place merely to awake Widmark to his love for the singer, reduces the film to trifling proportions. The plot structure is painfully mechanical and obvious. Only characterizations and the psychotic continuities lend it temporary semblance of solidity.”

The Albany Times-Union film critic was unenthusiastic: “Having whooped the undeniable physical assets of Marilyn Monroe from the rooftops, her home studio seems bent now upon telling the world that its blond property is also geared for heavy dramatic acting. The effort put forth…is something less than overwhelming, and seems oddly unnecessary. Why not just let her just be Marilyn Monroe, instead of a psychotic menace?....Miss Monroe walks through the picture as if she had been hit on the head….The action, transpiring entirely in the hotel, never gets higher than the eighth floor…..The picture has a brunette stranger, Ann Bancroft, as a nightclub songstress who jilts Widmark, takes him back the same evening. Not sensational—but neither is she psychotic.”

The film's reputation has improved since its release, with many modern critics considering Monroe's performance as initially underrated. It is now considered by Monroe fans to contain some of her best acting. 
Film critic Dennis Schwartz gave the film a mostly positive 2011 review, and seems to be captured by Monroe's performance.  He wrote, "Wacko psychological thriller, set entirely in a NYC hotel, and helmed without urgency by Roy Ward Baker (The Vault of Horror/Asylum/Scars of Dracula). It lacks emotional depth, but is diverting as it gives off nervous energy and remains watchable throughout. Marilyn Monroe was in 12 previous films, but this was her first co-starring headliner role. Playing someone mentally deranged, Marilyn wonderfully channels how her mentally troubled mom acted and gives a  believable performance (she's the best reason for seeing this forgettable pic). It's based on a novel by Charlotte Armstrong and is written by Daniel Taradash."

Don't Bother to Knock has a rare 100% critics score on Rotten Tomatoes, although this is based on only 11 reviews as of 2021.

Recognition
The film was nominated for consideration by the American Film Institute on its 2001 list AFI's 100 Years...100 Thrills.

References

External links

 
 
 
 
 
 

1952 films
1950s psychological thriller films
20th Century Fox films
American psychological thriller films
American black-and-white films
Film noir
Films based on American novels
Films directed by Roy Ward Baker
Films set in hotels
Films set in New York City
Films based on works by Charlotte Armstrong
1950s English-language films
1950s American films